Huriye Ekşi (born 1 March 1969) is a Turkish archer. She competed in the women's individual and team events at the 1988 Summer Olympics.

References

1969 births
Living people
Turkish female archers
Olympic archers of Turkey
Archers at the 1988 Summer Olympics
Place of birth missing (living people)